Azizlu (also Romanized as ‘Azīzlū; also known as ‘Azīzlī) is a village in Chaypareh-ye Bala Rural District, Zanjanrud District, Zanjan County, Zanjan Province, Iran. At the 2006 census, its population was 25, in 6 families.

References 

Populated places in Zanjan County